Francesco Giacomo Tricomi (5 May 1897 – 21 November 1978) was an Italian mathematician famous for his studies on mixed type partial differential equations. He was also the author of a book on integral equations.

Biography

Tricomi was born in Naples. He first enrolled in the University of Bologna, where he took chemistry courses. However, Tricomi realized that he preferred physics rather than chemistry; he moved to the University of Naples in 1915. He graduated at the University of Naples in 1918 and later was assistant to Francesco Severi, first in Padua and then in Rome. Later he was professor at Turin, called by Giuseppe Peano, a position he held until his retirement in 1967.

He was an Invited Speaker of the ICM in 1928 at Bologna and in 1932 in Zurich. From 1943 to 1945 and from  1948 to 1951 at the California Institute of Technology of  Pasadena, he collaborated on the manual of special  functions for the Bateman manuscript project, together with Arthur Erdélyi, Wilhelm Magnus and Fritz Oberhettinger.

Tricomi was a member of the Accademia nazionale dei Lincei and of the Accademia delle Scienze di Torino (Turin Academy of Sciences), of which he was also president.

Selected publications 
 Vorlesungen über Orthogonalreihen, Springer Verlag, Berlino, 1955 (traduzione di: Serie ortogonali di funzioni,  Istituto Editoriale Gheroni, 1948)
 Integral Equations, Dover, New York, 1985, ; 
 Equazioni differenziali, 3rd edition, Boringhieri, 1961 (translated by Elizabeth McHarg into English as );  
 Carlo Ferrari  e Francesco Giacomo Tricomi, Aerodinamica transonica, Cremonese, Roma, 1962 
 Funzioni Analitiche, Nicola Zanichelli Editore, Bologna, 1961 (reprint of 2nd edn.);  
 Lezioni sulle funzioni ipergeometriche confluenti, Gheroni, Torino, 1952
 Funzioni ipergeometriche confluenti, Cremonese, Roma, 1954
 Funzioni ellittiche, Nicola Zanichelli Editore, Bologna, 1937
 Lezioni di analisi matematica, CEDAM, 1965, 
 Esercizi e complementi di analisi matematica, CEDAM, 1951
 Lezioni sulle equazioni a derivate parziali, Editrice Gheroni Torino, 1954
 Equazioni a derivate parziali, Edizioni Cremonese, Roma, 1957
 A. Erdélyi, W. Magnus F. Oberhettinger, F. G. Tricomi, Higher transcendental functions. (3 vols.), McGraw-Hill, New York, 1953 (fa parte del Bateman manuscript project) 
 A. Erdélyi, W. Magnus F. Oberhettinger, F. G. Tricomi, Tables of integral transforms, McGraw-Hill, New York, 1954 (fa parte del Bateman manuscript project)
.

See also
Confluent hypergeometric function
Transonic

References

Biographical and general references
.

Notes

External links

Page at Accademia delle Scienze of Turin 
Integral Equations by F.G. Tricomi 

1897 births
1978 deaths
19th-century Neapolitan people
20th-century Italian mathematicians
PDE theorists